Zeitschrift für Physikalische Chemie (English: Journal of Physical Chemistry) is a monthly peer-reviewed scientific journal covering physical chemistry that is published by Oldenbourg Wissenschaftsverlag. Its English subtitle is "International Journal of Research in Physical Chemistry and Chemical Physics". It was established in 1887 by Wilhelm Ostwald, Jacobus Henricus van 't Hoff, and Svante August Arrhenius as the first scientific journal for publications specifically in the field of physical chemistry. The editor-in-chief is Klaus Rademann (Humboldt University of Berlin).

Abstracting and indexing 
The journal is abstracted and indexed in:

According to the Journal Citation Reports, the journal has a 2020 impact factor of 2.408.

References

External links 
 

Physical chemistry journals
Publications established in 1887
Monthly journals
De Gruyter academic journals
English-language journals
Jacobus Henricus van 't Hoff